Helena Antonia (1550–1595) was a bearded female court dwarf of Maria of Austria, Holy Roman Empress and was a favorite of Margaret of Austria, Queen of Spain, and also a lady-in-waiting for Constance of Austria, Queen of Poland.  She was born in Liège.Ulmus, Marcus Antonius. Physiologia barbae humanae, p. 307 (1603)Reynolds, Reginald. Beards: Their Social Standing, Religious Involvements, Decorative Possibilities, and Value Offence and Defence Through the Ages, p. 291 (1950) ("Ulmus [has] useful information, showing the royal patronage often offered to bearded ladies.... and the bearded Helena Antonia, according to Ulmus (p. 307) was a special favourite of Margarita of Austria, later Queen of Spain.")Souvenir Print of Helena Antonia, Bearded Lady at the Court of the Archduchess of Austria, Maria of Spain, waddesdon.org.uk, Retrieved 10 September 2013

References

External links
Polska. Dzieje cywilizacji i narodu - Rzeczpospolita szlachecka, s. 17

Bearded women
People with dwarfism
People from Liège
Spanish ladies-in-waiting
1550 births
1595 deaths
German ladies-in-waiting
Polish ladies-in-waiting
16th-century Polish women